Agbassa is the name of one of the two Urhobo kingdoms in Warri South Local Government Area, Delta State, Nigeria, the other being Okere-Urhobo. 

The name 'Agbassa' is of British origin derives from its original name 'AGBARHA', which is still in use. 

The current king is H.R.M Orhifi Ememoh II, (Ovie Of Agbarha Kingdom).

Composition
There are approximately seven communities that make up Agbarha Kingdom (Agbassa):
 Otovwodo (The traditional Headquarters)
 Igbudu
 Edjeba
 Ogunu
 Okurode (Okurode Urhobo)
 Oteghele
 Ukpokiti
In Agbassa, the Iyerin festival is celebrated annually, as well as Esemor and Iniemor. Another festival, known as Idju, is celebrated every two years throughout all the communities of Agbassa, as well as Okere-Urhobo. This festival is called Idju Owhurie Festival, popularly known as Agbassa Juju, and it centers around the worship of the Owurhie, an Urhobo deity.

References

Ethnic groups in Nigeria